USS Florida was an Arkansas-class monitor in the United States Navy.

Florida was ordered on 4 May 1898, and awarded to the Crescent Shipyard, Elizabethport, New Jersey, on 11 October 1898. She was laid down 23 January 1899 and launched 30 November 1901 by Lewis Nixon and Arthur Leopold Busch, a marine engineer who worked at the Crescent Shipyard; sponsored by Miss S. Wood; and commissioned 18 June 1903, with Commander John Charles Frémont Jr., in command. The total cost for the hull, machinery, armor and armament was $1,508,881.84.

So that her name could be used for a new battleship, Florida was renamed Tallahassee in 1908 and was later assigned the hull number BM-9 in 1920. She was reclassified as IX-16 in 1921 and sold for scrap the following year.

Design

The s had been designed to combine a heavy striking power with easy concealment and negligible target area. She was manned by a total crew of 13 officers and 209 men.

Florida was powered by two vertical triple expansion engines driving two screw propellers with steam generated by four Mosher fire-tube boilers.

The ship was armed with a main battery of two /40 caliber guns, either Mark 3 or Mark 4, in a Mark 4 turret. The secondary battery consisted of four /50 caliber Mark 7 guns along with three 6-pounder  guns. Florida also had a  deck.

Service history 

Serving with the Coast Squadron, Florida trained midshipmen on summer cruises, and operated along the east coast and in the Caribbean waters. She participated in the Presidential Naval Review in Oyster Bay, Long Island, held by Theodore Roosevelt on 3 September 1906, and four days later reported to the Naval Academy for regular service as a practice ship. She was placed in reserve 11 September 1906, but returned to full commission between 7 June and 30 August 1907, for a midshipman cruise, and between 21 May and 19 June 1908 for participation in ordnance experiments. These included testing the then-new superfire concept where turrets were mounted in line with one turret elevated to fire over the other.

On 1 July 1908, Florida was renamed USS Tallahassee to free the state name for assignment to a battleship. On 1 August 1910, she was placed in commission in reserve and began a regular schedule of ordnance experimentation and occasional duty in the Panama Canal Zone and Norfolk area as a submarine tender. During World War I she served as submarine tender in the Canal Zone, the Virgin Islands, and Bermuda areas and on 30 September 1919, entered Charleston Navy Yard where she was decommissioned on 3 December 1919. Tallahassee was assigned to the 6th Naval District as a reserve training ship from 19 February 1920, serving in commissioned status from 3 September 1920 to 24 March 1922.

Tallahassee was redesignated as IX-16 on 20 July 1921, and decommissioned for the final time on 24 March 1922. She was sold on 25 July 1922, to Ammunition Products Corporation, of Washington, D.C.

Notes

Bibliography

External links 

 Crescent Shipyard, Elizabeth, New Jersey.

Arkansas-class monitors
Ships built in Elizabeth, New Jersey
1901 ships
World War I monitors of the United States